Mark A. Talamini is professor and chairman of surgery and chief of surgical services at Stony Brook Medicine; editor-in-chief of Surgical Endoscopy, the official journal of the Society of American Gastrointestinal and Endoscopic Surgeons (SAGES) and European Association for Endoscopic Surgery; and former president of SAGES.

Dr. Talamini specializes in gastrointestinal surgery, with a particular emphasis on the treatment of inflammatory bowel disease (e.g., Crohn's disease and ulcerative colitis) and the use of minimally invasive technology to minimize pain and scarring. He is certified by the American Board of Surgery. With more than 200 publications, Talamini is the editor of Advanced Therapy in Minimally Invasive Surgery (Decker, 2006), an in-depth exploration of new and emerging surgical practices. Talamini joined Stony Brook University School of Medicine in 2013 as chairman of the Department of Surgery and founding director of the Stony Brook Medical Innovation Institute. He was appointed chief of surgical services in 2015. Talamini is also co-director of Stony Brook's Surgical Outcomes Analysis Research (SOAR) Collaborative established in 2014.

References
 "Appendectomy: No Cuts, No scars, No sweat." TIME Magazine: The Year in Medicine 2008 (Dec. 1, 2008).
 "Dr. Mark Talamini of UCSD Named Chair of Surgery at Stony Brook." Stony Brook University (July 26, 2013).
 FDA Transcript of Medical Devices Advisory Committee's Gastroenterology and Urology Devices Panel (May 10, 2012).
 FDA Transcript of Medical Devices Advisory Committee's Gastroenterology and Urology Devices Panel (May 15, 2015).
 FDA Transcript of Medical Devices Advisory Committee's Gastroenterology and Urology Devices Panel (Feb. 26, 2016).
 "New Incision Free Procedure Leads to Weight Loss." NBC (May 6, 2009).
 "The No-Incision Appendectomy." TIME Magazine (Apr. 3, 2008).
 "Open Wide. No, Wider: Are We Ready for an Era of 'Natural-Orifice Surgery'?" Newsweek (Apr. 14, 2008).
 "UCSD Medical Center Study May Halt Heartburn." NBC (Feb. 20, 2009).
 "Use of Natural Openings May Ease Weight-Loss Surgery." CNN (Feb. 17, 2009).

External links
 Talamini's profile page at Stony Brook Medicine
 Talamini's journal articles on PubMed (National Library of Medicine)
 "Five Questions" video with Talamini (3:26 min)

Living people
American surgeons
Stony Brook University faculty
Year of birth missing (living people)